Harry R. Sokal (20 February 1898 – 7 March 1979) was a Romanian-born German film producer. He produced 22 films between 1926 and 1977. After working in the German film industry, Sokal emigrated following the Nazi rise to power in 1933. He lived and worked in Britain, France and the United States, before returning to Germany in 1949. In 1963, he was a member of the jury at the 13th Berlin International Film Festival.

Selected filmography
 The Wooing of Eve (1926)
 The Holy Mountain (1926)
 Two and a Lady (1926)
 Chance the Idol (1927)
 Eve's Daughters (1928)
 The White Hell of Pitz Palu (1929)
 The White Ecstasy (1931)
 Das Blaue Licht (1932)
 The White Hell of Pitz Palu (1950)
  Carnival in White (1952)
 Arms and the Man (1958)

References

External links

1898 births
1979 deaths
German film producers
People from Craiova
Romanian emigrants to Germany
Exiles from Nazi Germany